The Schulzengrundbach is a small river left of the Westerbach in Landkreis Aschaffenburg in the Bavarian Spessart in Germany.

Location 
Its source is east of Westerngrund-Oberwestern. It flows in southwesterly direction through the Schulzengrund valley and discharges in Oberwestern into the Westerbach.

Since 1 July 2013 it became famous, because the Geographic centre of the European Union is located in a wet meadow left of the Schulzengrundbach, when Croatia joined the European Union.

References 

Rivers of Bavaria
Rivers of Germany